Royal Air Force Errol or more simply RAF Errol is a former Royal Air Force station located near the village of Errol in Perth & Kinross, Scotland, on the north bank of the Firth of Tay approximately halfway between Perth and Dundee.

History

The airfield opened in January 1943. Errol housed No. 305 Ferry Training Unit RAF as a special air training conversion unit for the Soviet crews receiving deliveries of Armstrong Whitworth Albemarles. This joint operation continued until April 1944, despite cancellation of Albemarle deliveries in September, 1943. The RAF station originally featured a control tower, 6 hangars, and three runways arranged in an 'A' shape which are still visible today from the air. The military role of Errol airfield ended in 1948, shortly after the end of World War II.

Units

The following units were here at some point:
 No. 9 Gliding School RAF (May – November 1945)
 No. 9 (Pilots) Advanced Flying Unit RAF (August 1942 – June 1945)
 No. 260 Maintenance Unit RAF (June 1945 – July 1948)
 No. 271 Squadron RAF
 810 Naval Air Squadron
 No. 1544 (Beam Approach Training) Flight RAF (January – March 1944)
 No. 1680 (Transport) Flight RAF (April – May & September 1944)

Post war
In 1988, the airfield was purchased by Morris Leslie Group as a site for auctioning plant. The site serves as their headquarters, and they created a mixed-use business park on the Errol side of the airfield.  a haulage company and a garden supplies wholesaler are in residence.

Many of the buildings around the airfield are now derelict or in a state of poor repair. Only one runway appears to be in service for light aircraft for activities such as skydiving.

Vintage car rallies and other events requiring large flat open spaces take place at the airfield throughout the year. A weekly car boot sale is held every Sunday, which, in the summer months, is one of the largest in Scotland.

References

Citations

Bibliography

External links
Control Towers Website: RAF Errol
Photographs: Photos and archaeological information of control tower.
Photographs: RAF Errol in the 1980s

Royal Air Force stations in Scotland
Royal Air Force stations of World War II in the United Kingdom
Airports established in 1943